Jimi Maasi Glacier is a glacier in northeastern Baffin Island, Nunavut, Canada.

See also
List of glaciers

References

Glaciers of Baffin Island
Arctic Cordillera